Jo Byrns High School is a public high school in Cedar Hill, Tennessee. It is part of Robertson County School district. The school has 546 students in grades 6–12.

The school is named after Jo Byrns, the 41st Speaker of the United States House of Representatives, who was born and raised in Cedar Hill. Jo Byrns High School was a K-12 school, until Jo Byrns Elementary School opened in August 2006, making  Jo Byrns High School a 6-12 school. On August 19, 2016, the school's football field was vandalized after someone drove a vehicle on the field. The damages cost an estimated $1,000 to repair.

References

External links

Public high schools in Tennessee
Public middle schools in Tennessee
Schools in Robertson County, Tennessee